Baher or Bahr  (Persian: ی "باهر) is an Iranian anti-materiel rifle designed to damage watchtowers, fortifications, aircraft, APC, IFV and radar systems.

Design 
The Baher has a long barrel to increase its muzzle energy, the standard version is mounted on a tripod. The trigger must be pulled to eject a case and to fire separately.

Users 

 The Islamic Republic of Iran Armed Forces use an improved version of the Baher, which utilizes a bipod instead of the tripod.

See also 

 Arash anti-materiel rifle
 Anzio 20mm rifle

References 

Anti-materiel rifles
Sniper rifles of Iran
23 mm artillery